Drahomír Kadlec (born 29 November 1965) is a Czech former ice hockey defenceman.

Kadlec played in the Czech Extraliga for HC Kladno, HC Dukla Jihlava, HC Zlín, HC Litvínov and HC Slezan Opava.  He also played in Finland's SM-liiga for HIFK and Tappara, the Deutsche Eishockey Liga and the 2nd Bundesliga in Germany for Kaufbeurer Adler and EC Bad Tölz as well as Italy's Serie A for HC Neumarkt-Egna.

Kadlec played on the 1992 Bronze Medal winning Olympic ice hockey team for Czechoslovakia.

Career statistics

Regular season and playoffs

International

References

External links
 

1965 births
Living people
Czech ice hockey defencemen
Czechoslovak ice hockey defencemen
HC Dukla Jihlava players
HIFK (ice hockey) players
HC Litvínov players
Kaufbeurer Adler players
Philadelphia Flyers draft picks
PSG Berani Zlín players
Rytíři Kladno players
Tappara players
Olympic ice hockey players of Czechoslovakia
Olympic ice hockey players of the Czech Republic
Olympic bronze medalists for Czechoslovakia
Olympic medalists in ice hockey
Ice hockey players at the 1992 Winter Olympics
Ice hockey players at the 1994 Winter Olympics
Medalists at the 1992 Winter Olympics
Sportspeople from Příbram
Czechoslovak expatriate sportspeople in Finland
Czech expatriate ice hockey players in Finland
Expatriate ice hockey players in Italy
Czech expatriate ice hockey players in Germany
Czech expatriate sportspeople in Italy